Sammanthranapura Grama Niladhari Division is a Grama Niladhari Division of the Colombo Divisional Secretariat of Colombo District of Western Province, Sri Lanka.

Wattala and Kelani River are located within, nearby or associated with Sammanthranapura.

Sammanthranapura is a surrounded by the Hekitta and Mattakkuliya Grama Niladhari Divisions.

Demographics

Ethnicity 

The Sammanthranapura Grama Niladhari Division has a Sinhalese plurality (41.1%), a significant Sri Lankan Tamil population (35.7%) and a significant Moor population (21.5%). In comparison, the Colombo Divisional Secretariat (which contains the Sammanthranapura Grama Niladhari Division) has a Moor plurality (40.1%), a significant Sri Lankan Tamil population (31.1%) and a significant Sinhalese population (25.0%)

Religion 

The Sammanthranapura Grama Niladhari Division has a Buddhist plurality (34.3%), a significant Muslim population (23.8%), a significant Hindu population (21.0%) and a significant Roman Catholic population (13.3%). In comparison, the Colombo Divisional Secretariat (which contains the Sammanthranapura Grama Niladhari Division) has a Muslim plurality (41.8%), a significant Hindu population (22.7%), a significant Buddhist population (19.0%) and a significant Roman Catholic population (13.1%)

Gallery

References 

Grama Niladhari Divisions of Colombo Divisional Secretariat